Atlanta Airport  is a public airport located one mile (2 km) northwest of the central business district of Atlanta, a town in Elmore County, Idaho, United States. It is owned by the State of Idaho, Idaho Transportation Department, Division of Aeronautics.

Facilities and aircraft 
For the 12-month period ending July 29, 2005, the airport had 900 aircraft operations, an average of 75 per month: 89% general aviation and 11% air taxi.

Video
YouTube.com - Landing in Atlanta, Idaho
YouTube.com - Maule MX-7 landing at Atlanta, Idaho
YouTube.com - Maule MX-7 departure from Atlanta, Idaho

See also

References

External links 

Airports in Idaho
Buildings and structures in Elmore County, Idaho
Transportation in Elmore County, Idaho